Santamenes is a small but widely distributed neotropical genus of potter wasp. It has been proposed that  Santamenes, be merged into Pachymenes.
.

References

 Giordani Soika, A. 1990. Revisione degli Eumenidi neotropicali appartenenti ai generi Pachymenes Sauss., Santamenes n. gen., Brachymenes G. S., Pseudacaromenes G. S., Stenosigma G. S. e Gamma Zav. (Hymenoptera). Boll. Mus. Civ. Stor. Nat. Venezia 39: 71–172.

Potter wasps
Hymenoptera genera